The 19 & 20 Vict c 64, sometimes referred to as the Repeal of Obsolete Statutes Act 1856, was an Act of the Parliament of the United Kingdom.

The Bill for this Act was called the Sleeping Statutes Bill. This Act implemented recommendations made by the Statute Law Commission of 1854.

This Act repealed 120 statutes, which had been described as "obsolete".

Halsbury's Laws said that this Act was the first Act for statute law revision (in the sense of repealing enactments which are obsolete, spent, unnecessary or superseded, or which no longer serve a useful purpose). Courtenay Ilbert said that this Act was the first Statute Law Revision Act.

This Act was repealed by section 1 of, and the Schedule to, the Statute Law Revision Act 1875.

References
The Statutes of the United Kingdom of Great Britain and Ireland, 19 & 20 Victoria, 1856. Queen's Printer. London. 1856. Digitised copy from Google Books.
HL Deb vol 142, cols 1895 to 1896, HC Deb vol 142, col 872 and 880.

United Kingdom Acts of Parliament 1856